Saint Sister is an Irish traditional duo, whose music has been described as "atmosfolk."

Career
Morgan MacIntyre (from Belfast) and Gemma Doherty (from Derry) met at Trinity College, Dublin. They founded Saint Sister in 2014. They were voted the “Best Irish Act" by the readers of The Irish Times in 2016. Their debut album, Shape of Silence, was released in 2018 and was nominated for the Choice Music Prize. They performed an a cappella rendition of the song "Dreams" by The Cranberries at Lyra McKee's funeral in Belfast, who was killed by the New IRA in April 2019.

In 2020, the duo were part of an Irish collective of female singers and musicians called Irish Women in Harmony, that recorded a version of the song "Dreams" in aid of the charity Safe Ireland, which deals with domestic abuse which had reportedly risen significantly during the Covid-19 lockdown.

Personnel

 Morgan MacIntyre (vocals, synths, drum pads)
Gemma Doherty (vocals, electric harp)

Discography

Albums
 Shape of Silence (2018)
Where I Should End (2021)

EPs
Madrid (2015)

Singles
Tin Man (2016)
Causing Trouble (2017)
Is it too early? (Kilmainham) (2019)
Dynamite (2020)
The Place That I Work (2021)
Oh My God Oh Canada (2021)

References

External links 
Official site
Saint Sister on Bandcamp
Saint Sister on Soundcloud

2014 establishments in Northern Ireland
Folktronica musicians
Female musical duos
Musical duos from Northern Ireland
Folk music groups from Northern Ireland
Folk music duos
Electronic music groups from Northern Ireland